Fuente de Piedra is a town and municipality in the province of Málaga, part of the autonomous community of Andalusia in southern Spain. The municipality is located approximately 19 kilometers from Antequera and 73 km from the provincial capital of Málaga. It is located within the Antequera judicial district as well.

The small town is based in a dry basin amongst the Southern Spanish mountains and is most well known for the local Laguna de Fuente de Piedra, home to one of the largest populations of flamingoes in Europe. This is represented in the town by the summer celebration of the festival of ringing the Flamingo.

References

Municipalities in the Province of Málaga